Come Away with ESG is the 1983 debut album by American rock band ESG. Released by 99 Records, the album incorporates songs from ESG's first EPs, ESG and ESG Says Dance to the Beat of Moody.

In conjunction with its 35th anniversary, Fire Records reissued the album to glowing reception in 2018.

Come Aways critical resurgence has led it to be held in high esteem. It is regarded as a seminal work in no wave and post-punk music, as well as a key influence for the development of dance-punk and hip hop music.

Background
Ed Bahlman discovered ESG while serving as the judge for a talent show and became the band's unofficial manager. Tony Wilson from Factory Records approached the band after a performance at Hurrah in the Upper West Side of Manhattan, and three days later they began recording with Martin Hannett. The recordings helped bring Bahlman's focus to the band. He formed a partnership with Factory so that his 99 Records label could release ESG's eponymous debut EP in 1981.

ESG was a minimalist take on funk music, removing brass, saxophone, and synthesizers to leave vocals, bass, and percussion. The New York Times placed ESG second on its list of the best EPs and cassettes of 1981, and The Village Voice placed the EP third on its Pazz & Jop critics' poll.

"Moody" was released off of ESG as the band's debut single. A 12-inch remix single followed, and both versions found popularity at clubs in New York and London. Because of the single's release through Factory, many New York DJs assumed ESG was a London-based act. Paradise Garage listed the song in its top 50 all-time tracks. It became a foundational track for the emerging house music scene.

ESG released a second EP titled ESG Says Dance to the Beat of Moody in 1982. It includes "Dance" and "The Beat", which reappear on Come Away with ESG. The EP placed ninth on that year's Pazz & Jop list. As several of its post-punk contemporaries were breaking up, the band continued to keep some amount of distance from the music business.

Composition
Come Away has been stylistically aligned with the avant-funk, no wave, and post-punk movements. Paste called its sound dub disco with punk's edge. Resident Advisor said it fused disco, funk, and punk with avant-garde's flair.

Release and legacy

ESG recorded the rest of Come Away with ESG at Radio City Music Hall in 1983 and released the album through 99 Records later that year. The band's first performance after the release was at Danceteria. Around half of the tracks on the album are instrumentals. The songs that do include vocals focus on danceable chants. Shortly after the release of Come Away with ESG, the band became inactive for several years, in part because of the closure of 99 Records.

Decades after its release, Come Away with ESG saw a critical resurgence. It was named the 84th greatest album of the 1980s by Pitchfork. The album became influential for post-punk, dance, and hip hop acts. Kathleen Hanna stated that it influenced her work with Le Tigre. Royal Trux member Jennifer Herrema has also cited Come Away with ESG as an influence.

NPR Music dubbed the songs "prescient" for their time. They also felt Come Away proved disparate sounds like Latin funk and post-punk could be fused successfully. PopMatters argued that "all funky rock music was chasing after [Come Away]" after 1983, the year of its release. Treble ranked the album #23 on their list of post-punk's best albums. They claimed the album cemented ESG's legacy in the early '80s no wave scene. The band's "buzzy [and] rug-cutting" rhythms were seen for being essential to NYC dance-punk's future generation. Chicago Reader echoed this, seeing their "stark" genre fusion trickle into the scene's 2000s bands like Liars and the Rapture.  Resident Advisor called it "an essential dance music blueprint", noting that its "party chants" prefigured aspects of house music. Paste wrote that G-funk, a form of gangsta rap started in the late '80s, was anticipated through "About You"s "eerily twisting" synth.

Accolades

Track listing
All songs written by ESG.
 "Come Away" – 3:15
 "Dance" – 4:32
 "You Make No Sense" – 2:20
 "Parking Lot Blues" – 2:53
 "Chistelle" – 1:54
 "About You" – 2:05
 "It's Alright" – 2:38
 "Moody (Spaced Out)" – 4:18
 "Tiny Sticks" – 3:02
 "The Beat" – 2:17
 "My Love for You" – 2:54

Personnel
Credits adapted from Come Away with ESG liner notes.
ESG
 Renee Scroggins – lead vocals, guitar
 Deborah Scroggins – bass, backing vocals
 Marie Scroggins – congas, backing vocals
 Valerie Scroggins – drums, backing vocals

Additional musicians
 Tito Libran – congas

Production
 Ed Bahlman – production
 Howie Weinberg – mastering
 Don Hünelberg – engineering

Notes

References

External links
 

1983 debut albums
99 Records albums
ESG (band) albums
Fire Records (UK) albums
Post-punk albums